Centaurea virgata is a species of Centaurea.  It is native to Western Asia. The subspecies C. virgata subsp. squarrosa is known as squarrose knapweed.

It is found in northern California, Idaho, Utah and eastern Oregon. Plants are taprooted perennials and may reach a height of 36 inches. Flowers are formed in a slender urn-shaped head (4 to 8 flowers per head). Heads are slightly curved downward and resemble diffuse knapweed (Centaurea diffusa Lam.) on a diet but with rose-purple flowers. The head is made of a cluster of bracts and the tip of the bract is bent out. Seeds are pale brown and may disperse 60 feet when not spread by animals. The bent bract often allows the head to catch a ride on passing animals and is considered the mechanism for long distant dispersal. Older plants may have multiple rosettes on top of the long taproot.  The taproot allows this weed to thrive in dry sites so it maybe more invasive than diffuse knapweed in ultra-dry rangeland.

virgata
Flora of Western Asia